The Roman Catholic Archdiocese of Tunja is an archdiocese located in the city of Tunja in Colombia.

History
29 July 1880: Established as Diocese of Tunja from the Metropolitan Archdiocese of Santafé en Nueva Granada
20 June 1964: Promoted as Metropolitan Archdiocese of Tunja

Special churches
Minor Basilicas:
BVM Rosary in Chiquinquirá

Bishops

Ordinaries
 Bishops of Tunja 
Severo Garcia † (18 Nov 1881 – 19 Apr 1886) Resigned
Giuseppe Benigno Perilla † (17 Mar 1887 – 13 Mar 1903) Died
Eduardo Maldonado Calvo † (24 Jun 1905 – 31 Mar 1932) Died
Crisanto Luque Sánchez † (9 Sep 1932 – 14 Jul 1950) Appointed, Archbishop of Bogotá (Cardinal in 1953)
Ángel María Ocampo Berrio, S.J. † (6 Dec 1950 – 20 Jun 1964) Appointed, Archbishop of Tunja (see below)
 Archbishops of Tunja 
Ángel María Ocampo Berrio, S.J. † (20 Jun 1964 – 20 Feb 1970) Resigned (also listed above)
Augusto Trujillo Arango † (20 Feb 1970 – 2 Feb 1998) Resigned
Luis Augusto Castro Quiroga, I.M.C. † (2 Feb 1998 – 11 Feb 2020) Retired
Gabriel Ángel Villa Vahos (11 Feb 2020 – present)

Auxiliary bishops
Juan Nepomuceno Rueda Rueda † (1882-1892), appointed Bishop of Antioquía
Crisanto Luque y Sánchez † (1931-1932), appointed Bishop here; future Cardinal
Juan Eliseo Mojica Oliveros † (1967-1970), appointed Bishop of Jericó

Other priests of this diocese who became bishops
Norberto Forero y García † , appointed Apostolic Administrator of Nueva Pamplona in 1951
Carlos Germán Mesa Ruiz, appointed Bishop of Arauca in 2003
Jaime Muñoz Pedroza, appointed Bishop of Arauca in 2010
Froilán Tiberio Casas Ortíz, appointed Bishop of Neiva in 2012
Jaime Cristóbal Abril González, appointed Auxiliary Bishop of Nueva Pamplona in 2016
Jaime Uriel Sanabria Arias, appointed Vicar Apostolic of San Andrés y Providencia in 2016

Suffragan dioceses
 Chiquinquirá 
 Duitama–Sogamoso
 Garagoa
 Yopal

See also
Roman Catholicism in Colombia

Sources

External links
 GCatholic.org
  Diocese website

Roman Catholic dioceses in Colombia
Roman Catholic Ecclesiastical Province of Tunja
Religious organizations established in 1880
Roman Catholic dioceses and prelatures established in the 19th century
Tunja